Richard Allen Bickle Jr. (born May 13, 1961) is an American professional stock car racing driver. Now retired from NASCAR racing, Bickle, who never completed a full season in the NASCAR Cup Series, had a long history in short track racing. The Milwaukee Journal Sentinel described him in 2012 as a "stud on the short tracks in the late 1980s and early '90s and a journeyman who rarely caught a break in NASCAR." He won three NASCAR truck races, had a career-best fourth-place finish in the Cup Series in 218 career NASCAR starts.

Early career
Bickle was brought into the sport as a child, when he watched his father, Rich Sr., race throughout Wisconsin. The younger Bickle began racing motocross at the age of five. While winning the 250cc championship on Sunday nights when he was 16, he raced stock cars at Jefferson Speedway on Saturday nights in 1977. He went behind his father's barn to pick out one of his father's old racecars and selected a beat-up 1968 Pontiac GTO. "It was so beat up you could hardly tell what it was." Bickle started racing a 1974 Pontiac as a sportsman at Jefferson for the second half of the 1977 season and the whole 1978 season. Bickle stopped racing motorcycles after he graduated in 1979. He built a 1972 Ford Torino with a 302 cubic inch motor that year, which he began using at mid-season. He used the car to win a heat and the semi-feature at Columbus 151 Speedway in the car's first night out, and it ran well at Lake Geneva Raceway and Rockford Speedway. That off-season he changed the rear clip on the car to improve it for Rockford before deciding to give away the car and build a new one. In 1980 he raced weekly at Rockford, Lake Geneva, and Capital Speedway (now Madison International Speedway), winning 23 semi-features which was the most in the United States. He was named the Sportsman Rookie of the Year at Lake Geneva and Rockford.

Bickle turned his Rockford car into a late model in 1981 and raced the car to a Top 5 points finish at Lake Geneva and ninth place at Capital. He raced the car at Slinger Super Speedway and selected ARTGO races. He won his first late model feature that season at Lake Geneva. In 1982, he decided to try to run as many races as he could within 300 miles of his home, and he had raced in between 90 and 100 events by the end of the season. He had won a couple of features and had set fast time at Wisconsin Dells Speedway (now Dells Raceway Park).  At the off-season banquet for Slinger Super Speedway, he told track owner Wayne Erickson that he would win the 1983 track championship. Bickle focused on winning Slinger's track championship that year and he finished in the Top 5 in 17 of 18 features that season to win the track championship. In 1984 he raced primarily at Slinger, Wisconsin International Raceway (WIR), and Capital. Bickle won his first half-mile feature at WIR even though he had raced at Capital for several seasons.

Bickle updated his car, hauler, engine, and equipment for 1985 with a new sponsor. He won the season opener at Capital and several other features later in the season en route to winning the track championship. He had a good season at WIR and raced well at the ARTGO races that he ran. In 1986 he won the points championship at Capital Speedway. He had 17 feature wins that season and he ran well at Slinger, WIR, and Wisconsin Dells. In 1987, he raced at numerous Wisconsin tracks. He won a $15,000-to-win event at Calgary, Alberta, Canada in 1987. Butch Miller, who had led most of the race, went in for a pit stop with 60 laps left, and Bickle and Ted Musgrave gained the lead. The race was halted for rain and hail with 46 laps left, and it was declared over with Bickle receiving the win.

He had won 230 races at various short tracks, including Lake Geneva Raceway, Wisconsin International Raceway, and late model track championships at Slinger Super Speedway in 1983 and 1989. Bickle won the Snowball Derby at Five Flags Speedway a record five times: 1990, 1991, 1996, 1998 and 1999.

ASA
In 1990, he made his debut in the American Speed Association, a Midwest-based racing organization based primarily in short tracks. He finished runner up to Johnny Benson in Rookie of the Year standings.(Ironically, Benson would take over Bickle's old Cup ride in 2000.)

NASCAR Winston Cup

Bickle made his NASCAR Winston Cup debut in 1989 at Charlotte Motor Speedway, in his self-owned, unsponsored #02 Buick. He finished 39th out of 42 cars after his engine expired 37 laps into the race. He made his first start in the Daytona 500 the next year when, once again driving his own underfunded Oldsmobile, and finished 28th, just five laps down. Bickle competed in 11 events over the next three years (leading one lap at Charlotte in 1993). 1994 marked a then-career-high in terms of starts, driving ten races, most of them for Harry Melling. After years of limited starts, Bickle made the full-time jump to Cup in 1998, driving the #98 Thorn Apple Valley Ford Taurus for Cale Yarborough, replacing Greg Sacks who had been critically injured in an accident at Texas. Bickle had two top-five qualifying efforts and finished a career-best 4th at Martinsville and delivered an emotional post-race interview. When the sponsorship went away, Bickle signed with Tyler Jet Motorsports to drive the #45 10-10-345 Lucky Dog Pontiac. It was an up-and-down year for Bickle and the team; Bickle posted top-10s at the Pontiac Excitement 400 and the Pocono 500. However he had trouble qualifying for races, and after the Pepsi Southern 500 at Darlington, he was released from the team. Bickle drove some for Melling Racing that year. In 2000, Bickle did substitute duty for Joe Bessey's team, and drove one race for Morgan-McClure Motorsports the following year, in addition to driving once for Midwest Transit Racing.

NASCAR Busch Series
Bickle has found considerably more success in the lower levels of NASCAR than he has in Winston Cup. He made his Busch Series debut in 1993 at Atlanta, finishing 27th with engine failure. Bickle's best season in the Busch Series was 1994, where he won one pole and had four top-10 finishes in a limited schedule. In 2001, he made his first full-time run in the Busch Series, driving the #59 Kingsford Chevy, and competed in 27 events before he was released. He has run only one Busch Series race since then.

NASCAR Craftsman Truck Series

Bickle began racing in the Craftsman Truck Series in 1996 for Petty Enterprises, winning two poles, having 9 top-10 finishes, and wound up a solid 11th in points.

For 1997, he switched to the #17 DieHard Chevrolet owned by Darrell Waltrip Motorsports, and the combination was an instant success. Bickle started four races on the pole position, winning three. He nearly won a fourth race at Sonoma until both a chaotic next-to-last restart occurred as well as rookie Boris Said retaliating against Bickle for contact during that restart; foiling the race for Bickle. When the checkered flag fell on the season, he was second in championship points. Since then he has run a limited schedule in the trucks, the most starts he's had in a season since then is twelve in 2003.

Career after NASCAR

Bickle occasionally races at special events at his home tracks in Wisconsin.  , Bickle planned to open an auto fabrication business in Edgerton with his father, tentatively named Rock County Flatheads and Fabrication. Bickle had owned an auto customization at his racing shop in Mooresville. He began concentrating more being a businessman and by 2012 he operated three businesses. He owned a hot rod shop in Janesville, Wisconsin, a bar in Madison, Wisconsin, and a drive-shaft business in Madison. Bickle is co-owner of a controversial strip club in Bristol, WI.

Bickle built a new chassis that he raced from 2005 until 2010. He was dissatisfied with the car's performance and acquired one of his early 2000s cars back for the 2011 National Short Track Championship at Rockford Speedway. Bickle was second fastest in practice and raced in the top five during the feature. In 2012 he qualified third for the Slinger Nationals behind Kyle Busch and Matt Kenseth. After being sent to the back of the field for early-race contact, he battled his way up to the lead just after half way, and he finished sixth. At the end of the 2012 season, Bickle won the National Short Track Championship race at Rockford Speedway for the second time.

Bickle announced that 2013 would be his final season of racing stock cars; competing for the full season in the ARCA Midwest Tour, he also returned to Slinger Super Speedway where he won his fourth Slinger Nationals after the apparent winner, Steve Apel, was disqualified. Bickle battled for the lead in the middle of the 2013 National Short Track Championship race and ended up finishing fourth. He ended his career on the following weekend finishing 22nd at the Oktoberfest 100 ARCA Midwest Tour race at the La Crosse Fairgrounds Speedway on October 6, 2013. 
He came out of retirement in 2015 - racing at the Slinger Nationals, Madison, and several races at Wisconsin International Raceway. In 2015, he was inducted in the Southeastern Wisconsin Short Track Hall of Fame citing his two Slinger track championships and four Slinger Nationals wins. Bickle is the subject of a 2019 book Barnyard to Brickyard - The Rich Bickle Story and he announced a book signing tour of Wisconsin race tracks in July 2019. After the signing tour, Bickle continued to race super lates, and in 2020 said that the 2021 Snowball Derby will be his last contest.

Bickle started the 2021 year racing a snowmobile in January at Eagle River, Wisconsin. He won the Outlaw 600 class feature at the Vintage World Championship Snowmobile Derby. After several years away from a major racing series, Bickle would return to run the 2021 ARCA Menards season opener at Daytona for Empire Racing. On May 2, 2021, Bickle won the annual Joe Shear Classic ARCA Midwest Tour race at Madison International Speedway.  He won the Jim Sauter Classic ARCA Midwest race at Dells Raceway Park in early September. He was chasing the weekly Super Late Model season track championship at Slinger; on the following Sunday night he won the final race and finished second to Luke Fenhaus for the championship. At the time, he stated in an interview that he had raced at 226 race tracks. Bickle made his final career start at the 2021 Snowball Derby in early December.

Motorsports career results

NASCAR
(key) (Bold – Pole position awarded by qualifying time. Italics – Pole position earned by points standings or practice time. * – Most laps led.)

Winston Cup Series

Daytona 500

Busch Series

Craftsman Truck Series

ARCA Menards Series
(key) (Bold – Pole position awarded by qualifying time. Italics – Pole position earned by points standings or practice time. * – Most laps led.)

References

Autobiography

Barnyard To Brickyard - The Rich Bickle Story, John Close.

External links
 

Living people
1961 births
People from Edgerton, Wisconsin
Racing drivers from Wisconsin
NASCAR drivers
American Speed Association drivers
NASCAR team owners
ARCA Menards Series drivers
ARCA Midwest Tour drivers